Eric Paschall (born November 4, 1996) is an American professional basketball player for Leones de Ponce of the Baloncesto Superior Nacional (BSN). He played college basketball for the Fordham Rams and the Villanova Wildcats. He was selected with the 41st overall pick in the 2019 NBA draft by the Warriors and named to the NBA All-Rookie First Team in 2020.

Early life and high school career
Paschall was born in Sleepy Hollow, New York, the son of Juan Eric Paschall and Cecelia Brooks-Paschall. His siblings are Ellen, Eudora and Tia. Growing up, he was given the nickname "Stepzz" for his deadly stepback. Paschall played AAU ball with and befriended future NBA player, and future teammate, Donovan Mitchell. He attended Dobbs Ferry High School and averaged 20 points and nine rebounds per game as a sophomore. As a junior, Paschall was named state Class B player of the year and Westchester County Mr. Basketball. He averaged 26.0 points, 11.2 rebounds and 2.5 assists per game to lead the Eagles to Section 1 finals. Paschall transferred to St. Thomas More School as a senior, where he helped the team advance to the National Prep School Championship title game. Paschall was honored as the NEPSAC AAA Player of the Year.

College career
Paschall committed to play for Fordham. He debuted with 31 points and ten rebounds against New York Tech, setting a school record for most points by a freshman in his opening game. As a freshman, he was twice named Atlantic 10 Rookie of the Week. He missed four games due to a leg injury. Paschall averaged 15.9 points and 5.5 rebounds per game and was named Atlantic 10 Rookie of the Year. After the season, Paschall opted to transfer to Villanova after coach Tom Pecora was fired. He redshirted on the national championship team.

As a sophomore, Paschall averaged 7.2 points and 3.8 rebounds per game. He recorded a season high 19 points to push the Wildcats to win versus Creighton 79–63 on February 25, 2017. In the Big East quarterfinal, he had 17 points and five rebounds in a 108–67 win over St. John's.

Paschall missed two games in February 2018 with a concussion. He averaged 10.3 points, 5.0 rebounds and 2.3 assists per game as a junior. In the Sweet Sixteen of the 2018 NCAA Tournament, he had 14 points in the win versus West Virginia. In the Elite Eight, Paschall had 12 points and 14 rebounds in a 71–59 win over Texas Tech. He had one of his best overall games in the Final Four, scoring 24 points on 10-of-11 shooting to help the Wildcats beat Kansas 95–79.

As a senior, Paschall averaged 16.5 points and 6.2 rebounds per game. He was named to the First-Team All-Big East.

Professional career

Golden State Warriors (2019–2021)
On June 20, 2019, Paschall was selected 41st overall in the second round of the 2019 NBA draft by the Golden State Warriors. On October 24, Paschall made his debut in the NBA, coming off the bench in a 141–122 loss to the Los Angeles Clippers with 14 points, four rebounds, three assists and two steals. On his birthday on November 4, he scored a career-high 34 points with 13 rebounds in a 127–118 win over the Portland Trail Blazers. On September 15, 2020, Paschall was named to the NBA All-Rookie First Team.

Utah Jazz (2021–2022)
On August 7, 2021, Paschall was traded to the Utah Jazz in return for a protected 2026 second round pick via the Memphis Grizzlies.

On July 29, 2022, Paschall signed with the Minnesota Timberwolves on a one-year two way contract deal. He was waived on October 16.

Leones de Ponce (2023–present) 
On March 7, 2023, Paschall signed with Leones de Ponce of the Baloncesto Superior Nacional (BSN).

Career statistics

NBA

Regular season

|-
| style="text-align:left;"|
| style="text-align:left;"|Golden State
| 60 || 26 || 27.6 || .497 || .287 || .774 || 4.6 || 2.1 || .5 || .2 || 14.0
|-
| style="text-align:left;"|
| style="text-align:left;"|Golden State
| 40 || 2 || 17.4 || .497 || .333 || .713 || 3.2 || 1.3 || .3 || .2 || 9.5
|-
| style="text-align:left;"|
| style="text-align:left;"|Utah
| 58 || 3 || 12.7 || .485 || .370 || .767 || 1.8 || .6 || .2 || .1 || 5.8
|- class="sortbottom"
| style="text-align:center;" colspan="2"|Career
| 158 || 31 || 19.5 || .494 || .326 || .758 || 3.2 || 1.4 || .3 || .2 || 9.8

Playoffs

|-
| style="text-align:left;"|2022
| style="text-align:left;"|Utah
| 4 || 0 || 6.0 || .500 || .500 || 1.000 || 1.3 || .0 || .3 || .0 || 2.0
|- class="sortbottom"
| style="text-align:center;" colspan="2"|Career
| 4 || 0 || 6.0 || .500 || .500 || 1.000 || 1.3 || .0 || .3 || .0 || 2.0

College

|-
| style="text-align:left;"|2014–15
| style="text-align:left;"|Fordham
| 27 || 27 || 31.2 || .419 || .315 || .794 || 5.5 || 1.0 || .8 || .4 || 15.9
|-
| style="text-align:left;"|2016–17
| style="text-align:left;"|Villanova 
| 36 || 8 || 21.7 || .513 || .279 || .695 || 3.8 || .6 || .5 || .5 || 7.2
|-
| style="text-align:left;"|2017–18
| style="text-align:left;"|Villanova
| 38 || 38 || 29.8 || .533 || .356 || .813 || 5.3 || 2.2 || .9 || .6 || 10.6
|-
| style="text-align:left;"|2018–19
| style="text-align:left;"|Villanova
| 36 || 36 || 36.1 || .447 || .348 || .746 || 6.1 || 2.1 || .7 || .5 || 16.5
|- class="sortbottom"
| style="text-align:center;" colspan="2"|Career
| 137 || 109 || 29.6 || .468 || .331 || .765 || 5.1 || 1.5 || .7 || .5 || 12.3

References

External links

 Villanova Wildcats bio

1996 births
Living people
21st-century African-American sportspeople
African-American basketball players
American men's basketball players
Basketball players from New York (state)
Fordham Rams men's basketball players
Golden State Warriors draft picks
Golden State Warriors players
People from Dobbs Ferry, New York
Power forwards (basketball)
Sportspeople from Westchester County, New York
Utah Jazz players
Villanova Wildcats men's basketball players